The white-throated sierra finch (Idiopsar erythronotus) is a species of bird in the family Thraupidae.

It is found in Bolivia, Chile, and Peru where its natural habitat is subtropical or tropical high-altitude grassland.

References

white-throated sierra finch
Birds of the Puna grassland
white-throated sierra finch
white-throated sierra finch
Taxonomy articles created by Polbot
Taxobox binomials not recognized by IUCN